International University (IU) is a private higher education  institution specializing in  medicine and medical science. Established in 2002, IU is recognized and nationally accredited by the government of Cambodia, the Ministry of Education, Youth and Sports and the Accreditation Committee of Cambodia (ACC). International University education standards are recognized by transnational medical institutions such as the Asia–Europe Foundation, Association of Southeast Asian Institutions of Higher Learning (ASAIHL), UN World Health Organization - including accreditation with the United States-based Educational Commission for Foreign Medical Graduates (ECFMG), Foundation for Advancement of International Medical Education and Research (FAIMER) and International Medical Education Directory (IMED) enabling medical school graduates to take the three complete steps of the United States Medical Licensing Examination (USMLE) and on successful completion can register for physician residency and practice medicine in the United States. The medium of instruction used at IU are English and Khmer.

Faculties
 Medicine and Pediatrics
 Nursing Sciences
 Dentistry
 Humanities and Languages
 Science and Technology
 Agriculture and Rural Development
 School of Public Health
 (Business and Economics)
 (Social Sciences and Journalism)
 (Law)

Tuition 
Approximately $3,000 a year starting the fall semester 2009 for medical students.

Academic collaborations

 Vinayaka Mission's Research Foundation, India
 National University of Laos
 National University of Malaysia
 Our Lady of Fatima University, Philippines
 Rizal Technological University, Philippines
 Otorhinolaryngology Research Center, Russia
 Peoples' Friendship University of Russia
 Research Institute of Pediatric Hematology of Russia
 Chulalongkorn University, Thailand
 Chiang Mai University, Thailand
 Khon Kaen University, Thailand
 Mahidol University, Thailand
 Rangsit University, Thailand

Accreditation and recognition

Domestic 
 Cambodian Higher Education Association (CHEA)
 Accreditation Committee of Cambodia (ACC)
 Royal Government of Cambodia

Foreign 
 AVICENNA Directory for medicine, Denmark
 Asian Medical Education Association (AMEA), Hong Kong
 Asia–Europe Foundation (ASEF), Singapore
 Association of Southeast Asian Institutions of Higher Learning (ASAIHL), Thailand
 Institute for International Medical Education (IIME), United States
 International Medical Education Directory, United States

See also 
 List of medical schools
 List of pharmacy schools
 International medical graduate

Notes

External links 
  Official Website
 UN World Health Organization (WHO) Directory of Medical Schools
 FAIMER Foundation for the Advancement of International Medical Education and Research (in English)

Educational institutions established in 2002
Universities in Cambodia
Schools in Cambodia
International universities
Education in Phnom Penh
2002 establishments in Cambodia